Mike Eldred may refer to:

 Mike Eldred (guitarist) (born 1961), American guitarist and luthier
 Mike Eldred (singer) (born 1965), American musical theater performer